Waldemar Włodzimierz Witkowski (born 29 October 1953 in Poznań) is a Polish politician, current leader of the Labour Union, and one of the leaders of the coalition Lewica i Demokraci (Left and the Democrats) (of which the Labour Union is part). Since 2006 he is a member of the Greater Poland Regional Assembly.

Witkowski was born in Poznań in 1953. He is married and has two children: a daughter, Monika, and son, Maciej. Witkowski is also a notable cooperation movement activist.

He was a member of the Polish United Workers' Party from 1976 until the party dissolved itself in 1990. Then he joined the Labour Union, and quickly rose to become one of the union's leaders in Greater Poland Voivodeship.

Witkowski served as an honorary member of the executive body of the re-election campaign of President Aleksander Kwaśniewski in 2000 (when the Labour Union supported Kwaśniewski).

The Labour Union and Democratic Left Alliance (SLD) formed a coalition prior to the 2001 parliamentary elections. Witkowski served as one of the coalition's campaign leaders, although he didn't run himself for the Sejm or the Senate.

From 2001 to 2005, he was first deputy of the Greater Poland Voivode. In the 2005 presidential election, he supported Marek Borowski. Since the 2006 local elections, however, Witkowski has been a member of the Greater Poland Regional Assembly.

He was elected a leader of the Labour Union on 25 February 2006. The Labour Union, the Democratic Left Alliance, the Social Democrats of Poland (SdPl) and the Polish Democratic Party (PD) formed the LiD coalition in 2006, just prior to the impending local government elections. Witkowski became one of the joint leaders of the new grouping alongside Wojciech Olejniczak of SLD, Janusz Onyszkiewicz of PD, Marek Borowski of SdPl and former President Kwaśniewski.

Witkowski contested the October 2007 parliamentary elections, as a LiD candidate in the district of Poznań. However, despite being No. 2 on the party list, he did not manage to gain enough votes for election to the Sejm (lower chamber of parliament).

Witkowski was also one of eleven candidates in the 2020 presidential election. He did not submit 100,000 eligible signatures until after the election day change, which resulted in the electoral commission denying his application. The decision was overturned by the Supreme Court. In the 28th of June vote he received 27,290 ballots (0.14% nationwide), leaving him second-to-last, with just Mirosław Piotrowski getting 6 thousand fewer. Witkowski refused to support any of the two candidates in the runoff.

Honours 

 Knight's Cross of the Order of Polonia Restituta (2012)
 Gold Cross of Merit (1999)
 Silver Cross of Merit (1994)
 Bronze Cross of Merit

References

External links
 Official site

1953 births
Living people
Politicians from Poznań
Polish United Workers' Party members
Labour Union (Poland) politicians
Polish cooperative organizers
Knights of the Order of Polonia Restituta
Recipients of the Gold Cross of Merit (Poland)
Recipients of the Bronze Cross of Merit (Poland)
Recipients of the Silver Cross of Merit (Poland)
Poznań University of Technology alumni
Candidates in the 2020 Polish presidential election
Recipient of the Meritorious Activist of Culture badge